Roger Houangni (born 2 November 1957) is a Beninese boxer. He competed in the men's light middleweight event at the 1980 Summer Olympics. At the 1980 Summer Olympics, he lost to Jackson Rivera of Venezuela.

References

1957 births
Living people
Beninese male boxers
Olympic boxers of Benin
Boxers at the 1980 Summer Olympics
Place of birth missing (living people)
Light-middleweight boxers